WTKJ-LD, channel 19 is a Christian religious television station in Watertown, New York. It has broadcast on Channel 19 in Watertown since August 2008.

WTKJ-LD was originally a low-power independent in Philadelphia, New York; the station was sold by Tammy M. Celenza in June 2007 to EICB TV for $7,000. In 2017, the then-WTKJ-LP was transferred to Edge Spectrum, a company that seeks to use upcoming ATSC 3.0 standards to datacast via low-power UHF stations such as WTKJ-LD.

Digital transition
As a low-power station, WTKJ-LD was not required to transition to digital broadcasting when full-power stations did so in 2009. It had voluntarily applied to flash-cut to digital operation on its existing frequency, UHF 19, with 1500 watts, and was licensed for this service effective July 22, 2022.

WTKJ-LD may be subject to co-channel interference by adjacent-market WSYT-DT 19 Syracuse as that station goes to its full licensed digital power, having abandoned former analog channel UHF 68 in Syracuse, New York.

References

External links

 TVfool coverage map for WTKJ-LD 19 Watertown
 TVfool coverage for co-channel WSYT-DT 19 Syracuse

TKJ-LD
Television channels and stations established in 2008
2008 establishments in New York (state)